The Bridgewater-class sloop was a class composed of two sloops built for the Royal Navy,  and .

Design
The Bridgewater class displaced 1,045 tons and were armed with two .

Service
Both ships were ordered from Hawthorn Leslie and Company, Hebburn in September 1927. They entered service in 1929 and were based at first on the China Station. Bridgewater was moved to the Cape in 1935, while Sandwich remained in China until the outbreak of the Second World War in 1939. Both ships were active in the Battle of the Atlantic, Bridgewater being based at Freetown carrying out patrols and escorting convoys until November 1943, when she moved to cover the Western Approaches. For the last two years of the war she was used in submarine training activities. Sandwich was also used in home waters, being based out of Plymouth, Liverpool, and Freetown between 1940 and 1944, though by 1945 her condition had deteriorated so much that she was kept at Bizerta. Both ships were decommissioned after the war, with Sandwich being sold for scrapping in early 1946. Bridgewater was retained for slightly longer, being used for static bomb trials during 1946 and 1947, until being sold and broken up in May 1947.

Ships

Notes

References

External links 

HMS Bridgewater and HMS Sandwich pictures
War service of HMS Bridgewater
War service of HMS Sandwich
Convoy Escort Movements for Bridgewater-class sloops

 
Ship classes of the Royal Navy
Sloops of the Royal Navy